Chistopol (Çistay; , Çistay) is a town in Tatarstan, Russia, located on the left bank of the Kuybyshev Reservoir, on the Kama River. As of the 2010 Census, its population was 60,755.

History
It was first mentioned in chronicles at the end of the 17th century. It developed very quickly, and by 1761 the number of inhabitants exceeded 1,000. In 1781, a decree by Catherine the Great granted Chistopol the status of an uyezd town, with the establishment of its own coat of arms. At the end of the 19th century, Chistopol became a major center of trade for grain. Prior to 1917, it was the second largest town (after Kazan) in Kazan Governorate.

During the Great Patriotic War, Chistopol become a shelter for the Union of Soviet Writers, which included Boris Pasternak, Leonid Leonov and other notables.

The town is notable for its Vostok watches factory, which was founded in 1942.

Chistopol was ranked first among Category III cities (population up to 100,000) in the 2015 edition of Most Comfortable City in Russia.

In the year 1781, Empress Catherine the Great established the center of the “Chistopol District of the Kazan Governorate” (Rusmania). In the 19th century, the city flourished in grain production. Nearly half of its lands were used for grain production along with trade. Its location and docks allowed for many resources and in due time, it became the second largest city in the Kazan Governorate (Rusmania). Following World War 2, many acclaimed writers were placed in Chistopol. Not long after this, a crucial watch factory was also transferred to the city in 1942. ‘Vostok’ watches are now very prominent in the town. Since then, the city has preserved its 19th century feel and remains a historical center.

Administrative and municipal status
Within the framework of administrative divisions, Chistopol serves as the administrative center of Chistopolsky District, even though it is not a part of it. As an administrative division, it is, together with one rural locality (the settlement of Yeryklinsky), incorporated separately as the town of republic significance of Chistopol—an administrative unit with the status equal to that of the districts. As a municipal division, the town of republic significance of Chistopol is incorporated within Chistopolsky Municipal District as Chistopol Urban Settlement.

Transportation
The town is served by Chistopol Airport.

Notable people
Alexander Butlerov, chemist
Sofia Gubaidulina, composer
Nikolay Likhachyov (1862–1936), scientist
Anatoly Marchenko, dissident
Boris Pasternak, writer
Vazif Meylanov, dissident

References

Notes

Sources

External links
Official website of Chistopol 
Chistopol Business Directory 

Cities and towns in Tatarstan
Chistopolsky Uyezd
Populated places on the Kama River